Alex Vanderkaay (born June 21, 1986) is an American competition swimmer.  At the 2007 World University Games, Vanderkaay won the silver medal in the 400-meter individual medley (IM).  At the 2009 World University Games, he won the gold medal in the 200-meter IM and again the silver medal in the 400-meter IM.  While attending the University of Michigan, Vanderkaay swam for the Michigan Wolverines swimming and diving team.  He was the national college champion in the 400-yard IM in 2007 and 2008.

Vanderkaay is the younger brother of former Michigan swimmers Christian Vanderkaay and four-time Olympic medalist Peter Vanderkaay, and older brother of current Michigan swimmer Dane Vanderkaay. Vanderkaay is currently a Senior Engagement Manager in the Healthcare industry for the New York-based, Flatiron Health.

References

External links
 

1986 births
Living people
American male freestyle swimmers
American male medley swimmers
American people of Dutch descent
Michigan Wolverines men's swimmers
Universiade medalists in swimming
People from Rochester, Michigan
Universiade gold medalists for the United States
Universiade silver medalists for the United States
Medalists at the 2007 Summer Universiade
Medalists at the 2009 Summer Universiade
21st-century American people